Giovanni Battista Capano, C.R. (1659–1720) was a Roman Catholic prelate who served as Bishop of Bitonto (1700–1720).

Biography
Giovanni Battista Capano was born in Naples, Italy and ordained a priest in the Congregation of Clerics Regular of the Divine Providence.
On 21 Jun 1700, he was appointed during the papacy of Pope Innocent XII as Bishop of Bitonto,
On 24 Jun 1700, he was consecrated bishop by Pier Matteo Petrucci, Cardinal-Priest of San Marcello, with Gerolamo Ventimiglia, Bishop of Lipari, and Domenico Belisario de Bellis, Bishop of Molfetta.
He served as Bishop of Bitonto until his death on 14 Jan 1720.

References

External links and additional sources
 (for Chronology of Bishops) 
 (for Chronology of Bishops) 

18th-century Italian Roman Catholic bishops
Bishops appointed by Pope Innocent XII
1659 births
1720 deaths
Theatine bishops
Clergy from Naples